Washington Township is one of twenty townships in Allen County, Indiana, United States. As of the 2010 census, its population was 36,092.

Geography

Cities and towns
 Fort Wayne (northwest quarter)

Unincorporated towns
 Academie

Adjacent townships
The township is adjacent to these Indiana townships:
 Aboite (southwest)
 Eel River (northwest)
 Lake (west)
 Perry (northeast)
 St. Joseph (east)
 Wayne (south)

Major highways

Airports
 Smith Field

Cemeteries
The township contains three cemeteries: Bethel, Hatfield, and Saint Pauls.

References

Citations

Sources
 United States Census Bureau cartographic boundary files
 U.S. Board on Geographic Names

Townships in Allen County, Indiana
Fort Wayne, IN Metropolitan Statistical Area
Townships in Indiana